Lloyd David Sauder (born April 8, 1950) was a Canadian politician. He served in the Legislative Assembly of Saskatchewan from 1982 to 1991, as a Progressive Conservative member for the constituency of Nipawin.

References

Progressive Conservative Party of Saskatchewan MLAs
1950 births
Living people